Indias de Mayagüez is the Professional Female volleyball (LVSF) team of Mayagüez, Puerto Rico. The team's home court is the Palacio de Recreación y Deportes.

History
The Team was organized in 1998, and the Puerto Rican Volleyball Federation approved the LVSF Franchise in 1999. The team's first season was in 2000. The team has consistently reached the playoffs and the semi-finals of the LVSF. The team's colors are green and white for the home uniform and white and green for the visiting uniform. The home court is at the Palacio de Recreación y Deportes in Mayagüez, Puerto Rico. The Indias de Mayagüez won the LVSF Championship in 2013.

Squads

Current
As of April 2016
 Head Coach: José Mieles
 Assistant coach: Gerardo Batista

References
 League Official website
 Indias Facebook page

Sports in Mayagüez, Puerto Rico
Puerto Rican volleyball clubs
Volleyball clubs established in 2000